Wilson Allen Wallis (November 5, 1912 – October 12, 1998) was an American economist and statistician who served as president of the University of Rochester.  He is best known for the Kruskal–Wallis one-way analysis of variance, which is named after him and William Kruskal.

Early years
Born in Philadelphia, he attended the University of Minnesota, Class of 1932, where he was a member of the Chi Phi Fraternity.  After receiving his degree in psychology and a year of graduate work at the University of Minnesota, he began graduate studies in economics at The University of Chicago in 1933, where he began what would prove to be lifelong friendships with Milton Friedman, Aaron Director and George Stigler.

In 1936–37, he served as an economist and statistician for the National Resources Committee. During World War II, Wallis was the director of research of the U.S. Office of Scientific Research and Development's Statistical Research Group (1942–46) at Columbia University; he recruited a team of bright young economists, including  Friedman and Stigler, to the Statistical Research Group.

From 1948 to 1954, Wallis served as the treasurer of the Mont Pèlerin Society.

University administration

Wallis served as dean of The University of Chicago Graduate School of Business from 1956 to 1962.  During his time as dean he established the "Chicago Approach to Business Education," which involved the application of statistical methodology to business.

He became president of the University of Rochester in 1962, a position he held until 1970, when he became the University of Rochester's chancellor and chief executive.  In 1975, he relinquished the job of chief executive, but remained chancellor of the university until his retirement in 1982.

In December 1992, the University of Rochester named a joint program of its Departments of Economics and Political Science in honor of Wallis: the W. Allen Wallis Institute of Political Economy at the University of Rochester. He died in 1998 in Rochester, New York.

Presidential advisor
In addition to his role as an academic and academic administrator, Wallis served as an advisor to U.S. presidents Dwight Eisenhower, Richard Nixon, Gerald Ford, and Ronald Reagan.  Under Eisenhower, he collaborated with Vice President Nixon on the report of the Cabinet Committee on Price Stability for Economic Growth (1959–61).  Under Nixon and Ford, he served on the President's Commission on Federal Statistics and on the Advisory Council on Social Security.  Nixon also appointed Wallis as chairman of the Corporation for Public Broadcasting, a post he held 1975–78.  Under Reagan, he served as Under Secretary of State for Economic Affairs (1982–85), and then, after Congress changed the job description and title, as Under Secretary of State for Economic, Business, and Agricultural Affairs (1985–89).

Selected works

See also
 Kruskal–Wallis one-way analysis of variance

References

External links
 W. Allen Wallis Institute of Political Economy website
 Records of W. Allen Wallis, Dwight D. Eisenhower Presidential Library
 

1912 births
1998 deaths
American statisticians
Presidents of the University of Rochester
University of Minnesota alumni
Presidents of the American Statistical Association
Fellows of the American Statistical Association
University of Chicago faculty
20th-century American mathematicians
20th-century American economists
20th-century American academics
Member of the Mont Pelerin Society